Back Like That is the second single by American rapper Ghostface Killah from his critically acclaimed fifth solo album Fishscale (2006). The song features R&B singer Ne-Yo and has become Ghostface's highest charting solo single on the Billboard Hot 100 and his generally second highest charting song after Kendrick Lamar's Purple Hearts where Ghostface is featured on. It contains a sample of "Baby Come Home" as performed by Willie Hutch as well an interpolation of "Song Cry" as performed by Jay-Z. A remix featuring Kanye West & Ne-Yo was produced and later included on Ghostface's sixth album More Fish. In 2009, Ghostface performed the song with Chrisette Michele at VH1's 6th Annual Hip Hop Honors ceremony.

Music video 
The music video for "Back Like That" was directed by Ray Kay and Mike Caruso. The video illustrates the deterioration of the relationship between Ghostface and his girlfriend after she cheats on him with a man with whom he has beef. Over time, Tony regains his wounded pride and eventually kicks her out of their apartment. As the story draws to a close, the man she cheated on him with walks into a set-up where Tony's friends lie in wait. He promptly turns around to run away and they all give chase. The video then concludes with a "to be continued..."

Remix 
The official remix featuring Kanye West & Ne-Yo was produced and later included on Ghostface's sixth album More Fish & his eighth album Ghostdini: Wizard of Poetry in Emerald City.

A second version of the remix has a new verse by Ne-Yo, different from his verse of the main remix, was included on Ghostface's compilation album GhostDeini the Great.

An all-female remix of the song made by DJ Cocoa Chanelle, Da Brat and Lil' Mo was featured in the Golden Globe-winning motion picture Precious (2009).

Track listings

United States 
A & B sides
 Back Like That (Clean)
 Back Like That (Dirty)
 Back Like That (Instrumental)
 Back Like That (Acapella)

Europe 
 Back Like That (Radio Edit)
 Back Like That (Remix Radio Edit)
 Back Like That (Album Version)
 Back Like That (Remix Album Version)

Remix 
A & B sides
 Back Like That (Remix) (Radio)
 Back Like That (Remix) (Dirty)
 Back Like That (Remix)	(Instrumental)

Charts

Weekly charts

Year-end charts

References

External links 
 Music video

2005 songs
2006 singles
Ghostface Killah songs
Def Jam Recordings singles
Ne-Yo songs
Songs written by Ne-Yo
Songs written by Ghostface Killah
Songs written by Jay-Z
Hip hop soul songs
Songs written by Willie Hutch